Route 80, locally known as Waverley Street, is a major arterial road in the southwest portion of Winnipeg, Manitoba, Canada. It runs from Kenaston Boulevard (Route 90) to Grant Avenue (Route 105).

Waverley Street serves as a major route to get to and from the industrial and commercial areas between McGillivray and Bishop Grandin Boulevards. The speed limit along the route south of Wilkes Avenue is 80 km/h (50 mph). Near Taylor Avenue, Waverley previously crossed the city's Canadian National Railway main line, where passing trains frequently caused major traffic delays. The city has since built an underpass to alleviate the problem, planned which opened in the Summer of 2019.

Not all of Waverley Street is incorporated into Route 80. North of Grant Avenue, Waverley Street is a one-way residential street running southbound through the River Heights neighbourhood, starting at Wellington Crescent. South of the Perimeter Highway, Waverley Street is as an unnumbered local road that runs south to Provincial Road 247.  Prior to the extension of Route 90 to the Perimeter Highway, this section connected to Route 80 at the Perimeter Highway.

In August 2019, the much anticipated Waverley Underpass was opened for use, one year ahead of schedule and under budget.

Major intersections
From north to south; all intersections are at-grade unless otherwise indicated:

References

080

Waverley West, Winnipeg